Monica Arac de Nyeko (born 1979) is a Ugandan writer of short fiction, poetry, and essays, living in Nairobi. In 2007 she became the first Ugandan to win the Caine Prize for African Writing, with her story "Jambula Tree". She had previously been shortlisted for the prize in 2004 for "Strange Fruit", a story about child soldiers in Gulu, Northern Uganda. She is a member of FEMRITE – Uganda Women Writers Association and the chief editor of T:AP Voices. She taught literature and English at St. Mary's College Kisubi before proceeding to pursue a Master in Humanitarian Assistance at the University of Groningen. Her personal essay "In the Stars" won first prize in the Women's World, Women in War Zones essay writing competition. She has been published in Memories of Sun, The Nation, IS magazine, Poetry International and several other publications. She is one of the writers announced as part of the Africa39 project unveiled by Rainbow, Hay Festival and Bloomsbury Publishing at the London Book Fair 2014. It is a list of 39 of Sub-Saharan Africa's most promising writers under the age of 40.

Early life and education

Arac de Nyeko comes from Kitgum district in northern Uganda. She grew up mostly in Kampala, but attended high school in Gulu, northern Uganda, for some years. She has a degree in Education from Makerere University, and a master's degree in Humanitarian Assistance from the University of Groningen in The Netherlands. While at Makerere she was an active member of FEMRITE – Uganda Women Writers Association, which she has credited for giving her "a place and space to write with a network of support and mentorship—handy when you are starting out." She is a contributor to the 2019 anthology New Daughters of Africa, edited by Margaret Busby.

Writing
In 2007 she won the Caine Prize for her short story "Jambula Tree", which is about two teenage girls falling in love and facing an unforgiving community as a result. One of Arac de Nyeko's other notable stories is "Strange Fruit", which contains an allusion to the song of the same name, and was shortlisted for the Caine Prize in 2004.

Published works

Essays
 "Pastor Love", in

Short stories
"Jambula Tree", in 
 "Back Home", in 
"Jambula Tree", in 
 "Jambula Tree", in 
 "Strange Fruit", in 
 "Grasshopper Redness", in 
 "October Sunrise", in 
 "Bride Price for my Daughter", in 
 "Chained", in 
"Jambula tree"
"The Banana Eater" in AGNI online, 2008
"Strange Fruit" in author-me, 2004

References

External links
"Ugandan Writers: One on One with Monica Arac de Nyeko, 2007 Caine Prize Winner", AfroLit
2007 interview in the East African Standard.
"Ugandans flying Africa’s literary flag"
Raymond Mpubani, "Arac de Nyeko, the leader in the women's writing renaissance", Daily Monitor, 20 October 2012
"Monica Arac de Nyeko, The Per Contra Interview by Miriam N. Kotzin"
"Meet Monica Arac de Nyeko, 2007 Caine Prize Winner who will be reading at ‘Women of the World: Talking about a Revolution’", AWDF, 28 February 2013
"monica arac de nyeko wins the caine prize", 21 July 2007
"Monica Arac de Nyeko (Uganda)", Centre for Creative Arts, University of KwaZulu-Natal

1979 births
Living people
Makerere University alumni
University of Groningen alumni
21st-century Ugandan poets
Ugandan women short story writers
Ugandan short story writers
Ugandan women poets
21st-century Ugandan women writers
People from Kitgum District
Caine Prize winners
21st-century short story writers